Bakewell  Bridge is a Grade I listed stone arch bridge spanning the River Wye in Bakewell, Derbyshire. The bridge is also a scheduled monument.

History 
The bridge dates back to the 14th century and was constructed using ashlar gritstone. The bridge has five arches with cutwaters, one of which supports the base of a cross, and was widened in the 19th century. It carries the A619 road, which begins in Bakewell and leads via Chesterfield to Worksop in Nottinghamshire.

See also
Grade I listed buildings in Derbyshire
Listed buildings in Bakewell

References

History of Derbyshire
Scheduled monuments in Derbyshire
Grade I listed buildings in Derbyshire
Bridges in Derbyshire
Bakewell